The Moorestown Township Public Schools (MTPS) is a comprehensive community public school district that serves students in pre-kindergarten through twelfth grade from Moorestown, in Burlington County, New Jersey, United States.

As of the 2018–19 school year, the district, comprised of six schools, had an enrollment of 3,997 students and 348.9 classroom teachers (on an FTE basis), for a student–teacher ratio of 11.5:1.

The district is classified by the New Jersey Department of Education as being in District Factor Group "I", the second-highest of eight groupings. District Factor Groups organize districts statewide to allow comparison by common socioeconomic characteristics of the local districts. From lowest socioeconomic status to highest, the categories are A, B, CD, DE, FG, GH, I and J.

Notably, the district was part of a lawsuit in 2003 called Hornstine v. Township of Moorestown over attempted policy changes made by Moorestown High School.

Awards and recognition
For the 1991-92 school year, George C. Baker Elementary School was recognized with the National Blue Ribbon Award of Excellence from the United States Department of Education, the highest honor that an American school can achieve. Moorestown High School was recognized as a Blue Ribbon School for the 1999-2000 school year.

Schools
Schools in the district (with 2018–19 enrollment data from the National Center for Education Statistics) are:
Elementary schools
George C. Baker Elementary School (378 students; in grades PreK-3)
Michele Rowe, Principal
Mary E. Roberts Elementary School (346; PreK-3)
Brian Carter, Principal
South Valley Elementary School (405; PreK-3)
Heather Hackl, Principal
Moorestown Upper Elementary School (916; 4-6)
Susan Powell, Principal
Michael D'Ascenzo, Assistant Principal
Dr. Michele Hassall, Assistant Principal
Middle school
William Allen Middle School (638; 7-8)
Matthew Keith, Principal
Cheryl Caravano, Assistant Principal
High school
Moorestown High School (1,293; 9-12)
Andrew Seibel, Principal
Robert McGough, Assistant Principal
Don Williams, Assistant Principal

In 1948, during de jure educational segregation in the United States, the district had separate elementary and junior high schools for white children and a combined such school for black children. The school for black children lacked language and mathematics courses offered at the white junior high school which meant, according to Noma Jensen of the Journal of Negro Education, black entrants to the high school were unable to get into science nor classical education streams as their prior education rendered entry "virtually impossible".

Administration
Core members of the district's administration are:
Michael Volpe, Superintendent 
James Heiser, Business Administrator / Board Secretary

Board of education
The district's board of education, comprised of nine members, sets policy and oversees the fiscal and educational operation of the district through its administration. As a Type II school district, the board's trustees are elected directly by voters to serve three-year terms of office on a staggered basis, with three seats up for election each year held (since 2012) as part of the November general election. The board appoints a superintendent to oversee the district's day-to-day operations and a business administrator to supervise the business functions of the district.

References

External links
Moorestown Township Public Schools
 
School Data for the Moorestown Township Township Schools, National Center for Education Statistics

Moorestown, New Jersey
New Jersey District Factor Group I
School districts in Burlington County, New Jersey